is a 1953 Japanese film directed by Ishirō Honda.

Cast

Kyōko Aoyama
Ikichi Ishii		
Keiju Kobayashi		
Fuyuki Murakami		
Ren Yamamoto
Akira Kubo		
Hisao Toake		
Noriko Honma	
Eitaro Ozawa		
Sachiko Murase		
Chieko Nakakita

External links

1953 films
Films directed by Ishirō Honda
Toho films
Japanese drama films
1953 drama films
Japanese black-and-white films
1950s Japanese films